The Morning Show  is an Australian morning talk show broadcast on the Seven Network and currently hosted by Kylie Gillies and Larry Emdur. The show airs between 9:00 am and 11:30 am on weekdays and follows Seven's breakfast news program Sunrise, with both programs closely interlinked. The program features infotainment, celebrity interviews and live music performances.

On weekends, a highlights show is aired between 10:00 am and 12:00 pm on Saturday and Sunday featuring segments from the week.

History
The show premiered on the Seven Network on 18 June 2007 and originally aired between 9:00 am and 11:00 am on weekdays. Adam Boland was the original executive producer of the show and promised to deliver a mix of news and views, new music and regular segments covering health and fitness, astrology, celebrity gossip, cooking, counselling and fashion. Boland built the show on the success of Sunrise which he also produced.

In March 2012, The Morning Show extended to a weekend with highlights of the week airing on Saturdays and Sundays after Weekend Sunrise. During the AFL season The Morning Show was not shown on Sundays in Victoria, Tasmania, South Australia and Western Australia due to AFL Game Day being shown in those states, until 2020 when AFL Game Day was axed as a result of the COVID-19 pandemic. Since then it is shown on Sundays during the football season Except in WA if a West Coast Eagles or Fremantle Dockers game is scheduled to start at 11am.

On 15 December 2014, The Morning Show was live to air as the 2014 Sydney hostage crisis occurred across Martin Place from their Channel Seven studio. The program continued to broadcast live pictures from their studio's windows, before all staff (including co-hosts Emdur and Gillies) were forced to evacuate the building, with the network's news coverage switching to the station's Melbourne newsroom where Nick Etchells anchored rolling coverage.

Ratings
The debut episode averaged 272,000 viewers, beating both 9am with David and Kim (147,000) and Mornings with Kerri Anne (126,000). Since its launch in June 2007 the show has rated first nearly every week against the Nine Network and Network Ten. The program did not lose a day until 31 October 2012, when it was beaten by Mornings, and did not lose a week until March 2016, when it was beaten by Today Extra.

Format 
The show's format is similar to Sunrise and consists of a mix of news, entertainment and lifestyle. The show also features live and prerecorded advertorials similar to those featured in rival shows Today Extra and Studio 10. The show is broadcast live at the same Martin Place studio.

When the show first started out there was a fixed music theme used regularly throughout the show. In 2010, the theme was scrapped with more popular recent music being now used as bumpers.

Presenters

Former presenters

Fill-in presenters 
Current presenters who have been fill-in hosts or co-hosts of The Morning Show in recent times include Angela Cox, Matt Doran, Sally Bowrey, Sam Mac, Mark Beretta, Matt Shirvington, Natarsha Belling, Monique Wright, Gemma Acton and Sonia Kruger.

Fill-in presenters for other roles, in order from most likely to be used to least likely to be used:
 News: Jodie Speers and Amber Laidler.

Advertorial presenters
Karen Ledbury 
Jamie Malcolm

Former advertorial presenters
Glenn Wheeler 
John Burgess
Leah McLeod 
Brodie Young

Logo history

References 

Seven Network original programming
2007 Australian television series debuts
2010s Australian television series
Australian variety television shows
Australian television talk shows
Australian television news shows
Television shows set in Sydney
English-language television shows